is a railway station in the city of Handa, Aichi Prefecture,  Japan, operated by Meitetsu.

Lines

Station layout
The station has two opposed side platforms connected by a level crossing. The station is unattended.

Platforms

Adjacent stations

Station history
Handaguchi Station was opened on April 1, 1932 as a station on the Chita Railway. The Chita Railway became part of the Meitetsu group on February 2, 1943, but the station was closed in 1944. The station was reopened on November 3, 1947. In March 2007, the Tranpass system of magnetic fare cards with automatic turnstiles was implemented.

Surrounding area
Handa Junior High School
Iwanami Elementary School

See also
 List of Railway Stations in Japan

References

External links

 Official web page

Railway stations in Japan opened in 1931
Railway stations in Aichi Prefecture
Stations of Nagoya Railroad
Handa, Aichi